Paratomoxia biplagiata is a species of beetle in the genus Paratomoxia of the family Mordellidae. It was described by Ermisch in 1949.

References

External links
Coleoptera. BugGuide.

Beetles described in 1949
Mordellidae